The 2016–17 season will be Crawley Town's 121st season in their history and their second consecutive season in League Two. Along with League Two, the club will also compete in the FA Cup, EFL Cup and EFL Trophy.

The season covers the period from 1 July 2016 to 30 June 2017.

Players

First team squad

New contracts

Transfers

In

Out

Loans in

Loans out

Friendlies

Pre-season friendlies

Competitions

Overview

{| class="wikitable" style="text-align: center"
|-
!rowspan=2|Competition
!colspan=8|Record
|-
!
!
!
!
!
!
!
!
|-
| League Two

|-
| FA Cup

|-
| EFL Cup

|-
| EFL Trophy

|-
! Total

League Two

League table

Results summary

Results by matchday

Matches

The fixtures for the 2016–17 season were announced on 22 June 2016 at 9am.

FA Cup

EFL Cup

EFL Trophy

Group stage

Knockout phase

Sussex Senior Cup

Statistics

Appearances

Top scorers
The list is sorted by shirt number when total goals are equal.

Clean sheets
The list is sorted by shirt number when total appearances are equal.

Summary

References

Crawley Town F.C. seasons
Crawley Town